José Cláyton Menezes Ribeiro (born 21 March 1974), known as José Cláyton or just Cláyton, is a former professional football who played as a left-back.

Although Clayton was born in Brazil, he spent a large part of his club career in Tunisia playing for Espérance Sportive de Tunis, and became a naturalized citizen in time for the 1998 World Cup. He played for Tunisia twice in that tournament, as well as one match in 2002.

He had a brief spell with Sakaryaspor in the Turkish Super Lig. He also spent time with Qatari-based side Al Sadd. He won the Q-League title in 2006. In 2006, he left Al Sadd for Turkish club Sakaryaspor. He has 38 caps (2 goals) for Tunisia

He was an over-age player on the Tunisian 2004 Olympic football team that exited in the first round, finishing third in Group C, behind group and gold medal winners Argentina and runners-up Australia. He was part of the squad that won the 2004 African Cup of Nations.

International goals

Honours
Tunisia
 Africa Cup of Nations: 2004

References

1974 births
Living people
People from São Luís, Maranhão
Tunisian footballers
Tunisia international footballers
Association football defenders
Brazilian footballers
Brazilian emigrants to Tunisia
Naturalized citizens of Tunisia
Tunisian people of Brazilian descent
Tunisian expatriate footballers
Olympic footballers of Tunisia
Footballers at the 2004 Summer Olympics
1998 FIFA World Cup players
2002 FIFA World Cup players
2004 African Cup of Nations players
2005 FIFA Confederations Cup players
2006 Africa Cup of Nations players
Étoile Sportive du Sahel players
Espérance Sportive de Tunis players
SC Bastia players
Stade Tunisien players
Sakaryaspor footballers
Al Sadd SC players
Stade Gabèsien players
Ligue 1 players
Expatriate footballers in France
Expatriate footballers in Turkey
Qatar Stars League players
Sportspeople from Maranhão